Hannah Steele is a British actress known for her roles in Wolf Hall and The Night Manager.

In 2016, she appeared in "Shut Up and Dance", an episode of the anthology series Black Mirror.

Filmography

Film

Television

References

External links

21st-century British actresses
British television actresses
Living people
Place of birth missing (living people)
Year of birth missing (living people)